was a Japanese filmmaker who directed 89 films spanning the period 1930 to 1967.

Naruse is known for imbuing his films with a bleak and pessimistic outlook. He made primarily shomin-geki ("common people drama") films with female protagonists, portrayed by actresses such as Hideko Takamine, Kinuyo Tanaka, and Setsuko Hara. Because of his focus on family drama and the intersection of traditional and modern Japanese culture, his films have been compared with the works of Yasujirō Ozu. Many of his films in his later career were adaptations of the works of acknowledged Japanese writers. Titled a "major figure of Japan's golden age" and "supremely intelligent dramatist", he remains lesser known than his contemporaries Akira Kurosawa, Kenji Mizoguchi, and Ozu. Among his most noted films are Sound of the Mountain, Late Chrysanthemums, Floating Clouds and When A Woman Ascends The Stairs.

Biography

Early years
Mikio Naruse was born in Tokyo in 1905 and raised by his brother and sister after his parents' early death. He entered Shiro Kido's Shochiku film studio in the 1920s as a light crew assistant and was soon assigned to comedy director Yoshinobu Ikeda. It was not until 1930 that he was allowed to direct a film on his own. His debut film, the short slapstick comedy Mr. and Mrs. Swordplay (Chanbara fūfū), was edited by Heinosuke Gosho who tried to support the young filmmaker. The film was considered a success, and Naruse was allowed to direct the romance film Pure Love (Junjo). Both films, like the majority of his directorial efforts at Shochiku, are regarded as lost.

Naruse's earliest extant work is the short Flunky, Work Hard! (1931), a mixture of comedy and domestic drama. In 1933–1934, he directed a series of silent melodramas, Apart From You, Every-Night Dreams, and Street Without End, which centered on women confronted with hostile environments and practical responsibilities, and demonstrated "a considerable stylistic virtuosity" (Alexander Jacoby). Unsatisfied with the working conditions at Shochiku and the projects he was assigned to, Naruse left Shochiku in 1934 and moved to P.C.L. studios (Photo Chemical Laboratories, which later became Toho).

His first major film was the comedy drama Wife! Be Like a Rose! (1935). It was elected as Best Movie of the Year by the magazine Kinema Junpo, and was the first Japanese film to receive a theatrical release in the United States (where it was not well received). The film concerns a young woman whose father deserted his family for a former geisha. When she visits her father in a remote mountain village, it turns out that the second wife is far more suitable for him than the first. Film historians have emphasised the film's "sprightly, modern feel" and "innovative visual style" and "progressive social attitudes".

Naruse's films of the following years are often regarded as lesser works by film historians, owed in parts to weak scripts and acting, although Jacoby noted the formal experimentation and sceptical attitude towards the institutions of marriage and family in Avalanche and A Woman's Sorrows (both 1937). Naruse later argued that at the time he didn't have the courage to refuse some of the projects he was offered, and that his attempts to compensate weak content with concentration on technique didn't work out.

During the war years, Naruse kept to what his biographer Catherine Russell referred to as "safe projects", including "home front films" like Sincerity. The early 1940s saw the collapse of Naruse's first marriage with Sachiko Chiba, who had starred in Wife! Be Like a Rose! and whom he had married in 1936. In 1941, he directed the comedy Hideko the Bus Conductor with Hideko Takamine, who would later become his regular starring actress.

Post-war career
The 1951 Repast marked a return for the director and was the first of a series of adaptations of works of female writer Fumiko Hayashi, including Lightning (1952) and Floating Clouds (1955). All of these films featured women struggling with unhappy relationships or family relations and were awarded prestigious national film prizes. Late Chrysanthemums (1954), based on short stories by Hayashi, centered on four former geisha and their attempts to cope with financial restraints in post-war Japan. Sound of the Mountain (1954), a portrayal of a marriage falling apart, and Flowing (1956), which follows the decline of a once flourishing geisha house, were based on novels by Yasunari Kawabata and Aya Kōda.

In the 1960s, Naruse's output decreased in number (partially owed to illness), while film historians at the same time detect an increase of sentimentality and "a more spectacular mode of melodrama". When a Woman Ascends the Stairs (1960) tells the story of an aging bar hostess trying to start her own business, A Wanderer's Notebook (1964) follows the life of writer Fumiko Hayashi. His last film was Scattered Clouds (a.k.a. Two in the Shadow, 1967). Two years later, Naruse died of cancer, aged 63.

Naruse was described as serious and reticent, and even his closest and long-lasting collaborators like cinematographer Tamai Masao claimed to know nothing about him personally. He gave very few interviews and was, according to Akira Kurosawa, a very self-assured director who did everything himself on the set. Hideko Takamine remembered, "[e]ven during the shooting of a picture, he would never say if anything was good, or bad, interesting or trite. He was a completely unresponsive director. I appeared in about 20 of his films, and yet there was never an instance in which he gave me any acting instructions."

Film style and themes
Naruse is known as particularly exemplifying the Japanese concept of "mono no aware", the awareness of the transience of things, and a gentle sadness at their passing. "From the youngest age, I have thought that the world we live in betrays us", the director explained. His protagonists were usually women, and his studies of female experience spanned a wide range of social milieux, professions and situations. Six of his films were adaptations of a single novelist, Fumiko Hayashi, whose pessimistic outlook seemed to match his own. From her work he made films about unrequited passion, unhappy families and stale marriages. Surrounded by unbreakable family bonds and fixed customs, the characters are never more vulnerable than when they for once decide to make an individual move: "If they move even a little, they quickly hit the wall" (Naruse). Expectations invariably end in disappointment, happiness is impossible, and contentment is the best the characters can achieve. Of Repast, Husband and Wife and Wife, Naruse said, "these pictures have little that happens in them and end without a conclusion–just like life".

Naruse's films contain simple screenplays, with minimal dialogue, unobtrusive camera work, and low-key production design. Earlier films employ a more experimental style, while the style of his later work is deliberately slow and leisurely, designed to magnify the everyday drama of ordinary Japanese people's trials and tribulations, with a maximum of psychological nuances in every glance, gesture, and movement.

Awards and legacy
Wife! Be Like a Rose!
Kinema Junpo Award for Best Film

Repast
Blue Ribbon Award for Best Film
Mainichi Film Concours for Best Film and Best Director

Lightning
Blue Ribbon Award for Best Film and Best Director

Mother
Blue Ribbon Award for Best Director

Floating Clouds
Blue Ribbon Award for Best Film
Mainichi Film Concours for Best Film and Best Director
Kinema Junpo Award for Best Film and Best Director

Film scholar Audie Bock curated two extensive retrospectives on Naruse in Chicago and New York in 1984–1985. Retrospectives were also held at the Locarno Film Festival (1984) and at festivals in Hong Kong (1987) and Melbourne (1988). Floating Clouds and Flowing have been voted into the 2009 All Time Best Japanese Movies lists by readers and critics of Kinema Junpo.

Filmography

Home media (English subtitled)
 Eclipse Series 26: Silent Naruse. DVD box containing Flunky, Work Hard (1931), No Blood Relation (1932), Apart From You (1933), Every-Night Dreams (1933), Street Without End (1934) (The Criterion Collection, region 1 NTSC)
 Mikio Naruse. DVD box containing Late Chrysanthemums  (1954), Floating Clouds (1955), When a Woman Ascends the Stairs (1960) (BFI, region 2 PAL)
 Naruse Volume One. DVD box containing Repast (1951), Sound of the Mountain (1954), Flowing (1956) (Eureka! Masters of Cinema, region 2 NTSC)
 When a Woman Ascends the Stairs (1960) (The Criterion Collection, region 1 NTSC DVD)

References

Further reading
 
 
 Bock, Audie, "Japanese Film Directors". Tokyo: Kodansha, 1978. Print, and Kodansha America, 1985 (reprint). 
 Hirano, Kyoko. Mr. Smith Goes to Tokyo: Japanese Cinema Under the American Occupation, 1945-1952. Washington, D. C.: Smithsonian Institution Press, 1992. Print
 
 
 The Kodansha Encyclopedia of Japan. Tokyo, New York: Kodansha, 1983. Print.
 McDonald, Keiko. From Book to Screen: Modern Japanese Literature in Film. Armonk, NY: M. E. Sharpe, 2000. Print.
 Narboni, Jean. Interview with Antoine Thirion. “Naruse Series.” Trans. Chris Fujiwara. Cahiers du Cinéma Oct. 2008: 60. Print.
 
 Rimer, J. Thomas. “Four Plays by Tanaka Chikao.” Monumenta Nipponica Autumn 1976: 275-98. Print
 Sarris, Andrew.  The American Cinema: Directors and Directions 1929-1968. New York: E.P. Dutton & Co., Inc., 1968. Print

External links
 
 Senses of Cinema: Great Directors Critical Database
 Better Late Than Never: The Films of Mikio Naruse
 Flowing: The Films of Mikio Naruse
 Strictly Film School reviews
 The great Japanese director you've never heard of
 The materialist ethic of Mikio Naruse
 Notebook Roundtable: Talking Silent Naruse
 Silent Naruse – Criterion Collection essay
 A Mikio Naruse Companion

Japanese film directors
People from Tokyo
1905 births
1969 deaths